One third of Crawley Borough Council in West Sussex, England is elected each year, followed by one year without election. Since the last boundary changes in 2019, 36 councillors have been elected from 13 wards.

Political control
From the first elections to the council in 1973 following the reforms of the Local Government Act 1972, political control of the council has been held by the following parties:

Leadership
The leaders of the council since 1973 have been:

Council elections
Summary of the council composition after recent council elections, click on the year for full details of each election. Boundary changes took place for the 2004 election increasing the number of seats by 5, leading to the whole council being elected in that year.

1973 Crawley Borough Council election
1976 Crawley Borough Council election
1979 Crawley Borough Council election (New ward boundaries)
1980 Crawley Borough Council election
1982 Crawley Borough Council election
1983 Crawley Borough Council election (Borough boundary changes took place but the number of seats remained the same)
1984 Crawley Borough Council election
1986 Crawley Borough Council election
1987 Crawley Borough Council election
1988 Crawley Borough Council election
1990 Crawley Borough Council election
1991 Crawley Borough Council election

Borough result maps

By-election results
By-elections occur when seats become vacant between council elections. Below is a summary of recent by-elections; full by-election results can be found by clicking on the by-election name.

References

External links
Crawley Borough Council

 
Crawley
Council elections in West Sussex
District council elections in England